Major-General Cyril Lloyd  (14 April 1906 – 27 July 1989) was a senior British Army officer who served during the Second World War.

Military career
Educated at Brighton Grammar School and the University of Cambridge, Lloyd was commissioned into the Royal Artillery on 25 December 1929. Posted to 57th Field Regiment Royal Artillery, he was promoted to lieutenant on 25 December 1932 and to captain on 8 March 1935. He then attended the Territorial Army officers course at Staff College, Camberley in 1939.

Lloyd saw action as a staff officer with the temporary rank of major serving with 12th (Eastern) Infantry Division as part of the British Expeditionary Force in France at the start of the Second World War. He was mentioned in dispatches and evacuated out from Cherbourg in June 1940.

He became Deputy Assistant Adjutant General to the General Staff of the Canadian Forces in July 1940 in which role he was appointed an Officer of the Order of the British Empire in the 1943 New Year Honours.

Lloyd became Assistant Director of Military Survey at the War Office in October 1943 and, after being promoted to temporary lieutenant-colonel on 27 January 1944, he became Deputy Chief of Staff for 21st Army Group in April 1944. In this role he took part in the Normandy landings for which he was advanced to Commander of the Order of the British Empire.

Lloyd went on to be Director of Army Education in December 1944, in which role he was promoted to full colonel on 11 April 1945 and to major-general on 2 July 1946. After leaving the army he was appointed a Companion of the Order of the Bath in the 1948 New Year Honours.

Lloyd went on to become Director-General of the City and Guilds of London Institute in 1949 and Chairman of the Associated Examining Board in 1970 before retiring in 1976.

Lloyd was a Liveryman of the Worshipful Company of Goldsmiths and received the Freedom of the City of London on 27 June 1949.

Lloyd died on 27 July 1989: both he and his wife were cremated and both were interred at St. Mary's Church, Horsham.

Family
Lloyd married Winifred Dorothy Moore; they had one daughter. He later married Marjorie Blanche Fripp (1916-2008), daughter of Isaac and Blanche Fripp.

Works

References

External links
British Army Officers 1939−1945
Generals of World War II

1906 births
1989 deaths
British Army major generals
Royal Artillery officers
Companions of the Order of the Bath
Commanders of the Order of the British Empire
People educated at Brighton Grammar School
People from Horsham
War Office personnel in World War II
Graduates of the Staff College, Camberley
British Army brigadiers of World War II